James "Winky" Hicks is a bluegrass musician and instrument maker from Grove Hill, Alabama. Hicks is a regular at fiddlers festivals, where he plays the banjo with his band, the Frontier Bluegrass. Besides string instruments such as mandolins, he also makes turkey yelpers. In 2011, he was named a "Black Belt Treasured Artist" by the Black Belt Treasures Cultural Arts Center, a non-profit from Camden, Alabama.

References

Living people
Bluegrass musicians from Alabama
American banjoists
American luthiers
American musical instrument makers
People from Grove Hill, Alabama
Year of birth missing (living people)
Country musicians from Alabama